The 2010 FIM Dig Deep Streetwear Swedish Grand Prix was the second race of the 2010 Speedway Grand Prix season. It took place on 8 May 2010 at the Ullevi stadium in Gothenburg, Sweden. The Swedish Grand Prix was won by Dane Kenneth Bjerre who beat Tomasz Gollob, Andreas Jonsson and Greg Hancock in the final. It was first GP winning for Bjerre.

Riders 
The Speedway Grand Prix Commission nominated Antonio Lindbäck as Wild Card, and Simon Gustafsson and Dennis Andersson both as Track Reserves.  The Draw was made on May 7 at 13:00 CEST.

Heat details

Heat after heat 
 (69.9) Andersen, Lindgren, Lindbäck, Woffinden
 (71.0) Hancock, Holta, Bjerre, Hampel
 (71.1) Jonsson, Zetterström, Crump, Sayfutdinov
 (71.0) Holder, Harris, Gollob, Pedersen
 (72.6) Holta, Pedersen, Andersen, Crump
 (72.6) Bjerre, Gollob, Woffinden, Jonsson
 (72.8) Sayfutdinov, Hampel, Lindbäck, Harris (F3)
 (72.5) Zetterström, Holder, Hancock, Lindgren
 (72.6) Bjerre, Sayfutdinov, Holder, Andersen
 (72.2) Zetterström, Harris, Woffinden, Holta
 (72.0) Gollob, Hancock, Lindbäck, Crump
 (72.1) Pedersen, Hampel, Lindgren, Jonsson
 (71.6) Andersen, Hampel, Gollob, Zetterström
 (71.2) Hancock, Pedersen, Woffinden, Sayfutdinov
 (71.1) Jonsson, Holder, Holta, Lindbäck
 (71.1) Crump, Bjerre, Harris, Lindgren
 (70.7) Hancock, Jonsson, Harris, Andersen (Fx)
 (70.7) Crump, Holder, Woffinden, Hampel
 (70.6) Lindbäck, Bjerre, Pedersen, Zetterström
 (70.2) Sayfutdinov, Gollob, Lindgren, Holta
 Semi-Finals:
 (70.1) Gollob, Hancock, Zetterström, Sayfutdinov
 (69.6) Bjerre, Jonsson, Holder, Pedersen (F4)
 The Final:
 (70.0) Bjerre, Gollob, Jonsson, Hancock

The intermediate classification

See also 
 Motorcycle speedway

References 

Swedish
2010
2010 in Swedish motorsport